Sopovskiye Zemlyanki is a rural locality (a village) in Filippovskoye Rural Settlement, Kirzhachsky District, Vladimir Oblast, Russia. The population was 17 as of 2010. There are 3 streets.

Geography 
Sopovskiye Zemlyanki is located 31 km southwest of Kirzhach (the district's administrative centre) by road. Krasny Ugol is the nearest rural locality.

References 

Rural localities in Kirzhachsky District